Diamella is a genus of beetle in the family Carabidae. It was originally described by Arnošt Jedlička in 1952 as Dianella. Hongliang Shi, Hongzhang Zhou, and Hongbin Liang proposed Diamella as a replacement name in 2013, since Jedlička's Dianella was a junior homonym of the gastropod genus Dianella, described by Gerard Pierre Laurent Kalshoven Gude in 1913. 

Originally monotypic, Diamella now contains five species in total:  

 Diamella arrowi Jedlicka, 1952
 Diamella barsevskisi Anichtchenko, 2016
 Diamella cupreomicans Oberthür, 1883
 Diamella kaszabi Jedlicka, 1952
 Diamella singularis Anichtchenko, 2017

References

Lebiinae